is a Sapporo Municipal Subway station in Shiroishi-ku, Sapporo, Hokkaido, Japan. The station number is T12. The station name means "East Sapporo".

Platforms

Surrounding area
 Sapporo Convention Center
 Higashi-Sapporo Heights, Higashi-Sapporo Station
 Daiei Higashi-Sapporo, Shopping Center
 Iias Sapporo Shopping Center
 Higashi-Sapporo Post Office
 ARCS super store, Higashi-Sapporo
 Maxvalu supermarket, Higashi-Sapporo
 Higashi-Sapporo Hospital
 Hokkaido My Home Center, (housing exhibition hall)
 Hotel Ascent Inn Sapporo
 Hokkaido Bank, Higashi-Sapporo branch
 Hokkaido Shinkin Bank Higashi-Sapporo branch

External links

 Sapporo Subway Stations

 

Railway stations in Japan opened in 1976
Railway stations in Sapporo
Sapporo Municipal Subway